Gérard Fombrun (21 January 1927 in Port-au-Prince – 1 February 2015) was a Haitian architect, construction engineer and sculptor. Fombrun studied sculpture and architecture in Haiti, France, and Puerto Rico. His sculptures, typically made with bronze, have been exhibited throughout Latin America and the Caribbean. One of his most emblematic achievements throughout his architectural career is the restoration and rebuilding of an old colonial-era sugermill now Musee Ogier-Fombrun.

References

 
 www.museeogierfombrun.org

1927 births
Haitian architects
Haitian artists
Haitian sculptors
2015 deaths